Mala (Tumala, Amala), also known as Rumaya, is a Kainji language of Nigeria.

References

East Kainji languages
Languages of Nigeria